Shoolini, (Sanskrit: शूलिनी) is the principal form of the Goddess Durga or Parvati, also known as Devi and Shakti.

Maa Shoolini (Mahashakti), the form and formless, is the root of knowledge, wisdom, creation, preservation and annihilation. She is Shakti or power of Lord Shiva.

Narasimha, the fourth incarnation of Lord Vishnu, couldn't control his rage after killing the unruly demon king Hiranyakashipu. He was becoming a threat to the entire universe. So, Lord Shiva, in order to pacify Narasimha, manifestated as Sharabha. Shoolini was also manifested with the blessing of Lord Shiva to tame Narasimha. 

Maa Shoolini is also popularly known as Shoolini Durga, Shivani, and Saloni, often being compared to Goddesses such as Durga and Parvati. 

She is also the Kula Devi (family deity), of Solan people.

Manifestation or Incarnation of Maa Shoolini 

It was the time when Lord Vishnu took the form of Lord Narasimha to save his devotee Prahlada. This was the 4th avatar of Lord Vishnu. Narasimha was half-man and half-lion, having a human-like torso and lower body, with a lion-like face and claws.

After Narasimha killed the demon Hranyakashyapu, the  devas or demigods were unable to calm his fury. Narasimha started on a spree of destruction, and no one could calm him. On seeing this, Lord Shiva decided to tame Lord Narasimha. Thus Lord Shiva took on the incarnated form of Sharabha, Sarabeshwara, to tame Narasimha. This form was part bird and part lion, and is also called Sharabeshwaramurti. 
Sarabha was an eight-legged beast, mightier than a lion or an elephant and capable of pacifying a lion.

Goddess Parvati then manifestated as Maa Shoolini and appeared in the right wing of Sharabheswara. She is black in color - that is why she is called Saloni. She is also holding a weapon called a 'Shool' and so she is also called 'Shool Dharini' - and is a form of Maa Kali or Maa Durga. She is also known as Shoolini Durga.

But some minor texts suggest that this was not the end. After Lord Shiva manifestated as Sarabha, Lord Narasimha got angry and assumed the form of  Gandaberunda, a ferocious two-headed-bird-animal to combat Sharabha. Gandaberuda had two heads, rows of teeth, was black in complexion and had wide wings. These two beings fought a long time, for which Lord Sarabeshwara released goddess Pratyangira from one of his wings while goddess Shoolini being the other wing. The Gandabherunda destroyed the form of Goddess, while Narasimha pacified Shiva.

Shoolini Mela Solan, the Mushroom city of India acquires its name from the sacred shrine of Goddess Shoolini positioned in Solan. The marvellous temple of Shoolini Devi is principally reckoned for the Shoolini Mela celebrated here in the last week of June every year.

Dedicated to the patron Goddess of Solan i.e. Maa Shoolini, celebrated in the honor of Goddess Shoolini commemorates the three days visit of the Goddess Shoolini Devi to her elder sister. The citizens of Solan as well as the devotees alight here from neighbouring regions congregate at the Shoolini Devi Temple.

Goddess Shoolini is taken out of her temple in an extravagantly ornamented palanquin. The procession passes through different locales of Solan and everywhere it is escorted in a very ostentatious manner. The Mata Durga Temple of the Ganj Bazar is the ultimate destination of Goddess Shoolini which is regarded to be the abode of her sister Durga Devi. The Goddess Shoolini halts at her sister's place for three days and then returns to her own domicile.

The return journey of the Goddess to her own temple is celebrated on the last day of Shoolini Mela with even more pomp and grandeur. On the third day, the festivity reaches its culmination. Solan is jampacked with a deluge of devotees and visitors and the entire township throbs with unequalled gusto and fervour.

Shoolini Mela is the quintessence of Solan's traditional.

Temple of Maa Shoolini 

Himachal Pradesh 
 Shoolini Devi temple at Solan

References

Hindu folk deities